Angonyx chelsea is a moth of the family Sphingidae first described by Ulf Eitschberger and Tomáš Melichar in 2009. It is known from the West New Britain Province in Papua New Guinea.

References

Angonyx
Moths described in 2009
Moths of New Guinea